Guillermo Baltazar Chong Díaz is a Chilean geologist and professor at the Catholic University of the North at Antofagasta, Chile. In 2018 he was named distinguished son of Arica. The mineral chongite is named after him.

In 2011, together with Zulma Brandoni de Gasparini and others, Chong Díaz discovered a well-preserved fossilized skull of the family Metriorhynchidae. The team determined it to be a specimen of Metriorhynchus westermanni, an extinct marine crocodyliform.

References

People from Arica
Academic staff of the Catholic University of the North
21st-century Chilean geologists
Chilean people of Chinese descent
Living people
Year of birth missing (living people)
Paleontologists